Battle of Otepää was a battle during the Livonian Crusade in 1217. The battle ended with a victory for the Estonians and Russians.

In February 1217, a large Russian force, along with Oeselians and other Estonians, arrived at Otepää to besiege it. The number of the besiegers is said to have reached 20,000 men. Because the stronghold was located on a very well-defended hill, the siege lasted for 17 days.

The Bishop Albert of Riga sent 3,000 men from Riga headed by the master of the order to relieve the trapped German force in Otepää. Near the stronghold they met the Estonian and Russian forces in battle. The Germans managed to get into the stronghold, but with very heavy casualties. The situation became very difficult for them. The long siege decreased the people's food and fodder to the minimum. The horses were said to have eaten the horsetails off each other. On the third day after the German relief army had arrived the stronghold, the negotiations started. Based on the peace they made, the Germans had to leave not only from Otepää, but from all of Estonia. It was the greatest defeat for the Crusaders in the Livonian Crusade to Estonia.

References 

Battles of the Livonian Crusade
Battles involving Estonia
1217 in Europe
Battles involving Livs
Battles involving Letts
Battles involving the Livonian Brothers of the Sword
Conflicts in 1217
Otepää Parish